The Belarusian alphabet is based on the Cyrillic script and is derived from the alphabet of Old Church Slavonic. It has existed in its modern form since 1918 and has 32 letters. See also Belarusian Latin alphabet and Belarusian Arabic alphabet.

Letters

Details
The  is used by some for the latter sound but, with the exception of Taraškievica, has not been standard.

In some representations of the alphabet, the affricates are included in parentheses after the letter  to emphasize their special status: .

 is not a distinct phoneme but the neutralization of /v/ and /l/ when there is no following vowel, like before a consonant or at the end of a word.

{| class=wikitable
| palatalization ||  || 
|-
| final || п || пь
|-
| before  || па || пя
|-
| before  || пэ || пе
|-
| before  || пы || пі
|-
| before  || по || пё
|-
| before  || пу || пю
|}

When a consonant is not palatalized and precedes , the apostrophe  is used to separate the iotated vowel:  . The apostrophe is not considered a letter and so is not taken into account for alphabetical order. In pre-Second World War printing, the form  was used.

History
The medieval Cyrillic alphabet had 43 letters. Later, 15 letters were dropped, the last 4 after the introduction of the first official Belarusian grammar in 1918. Since four new letters were added, there are now 32 letters.

The new letters were:
 The  ((CYRILLIC) EH) appeared in Belarusian texts in about the late-15th century.
 The  ((CYRILLIC) IO) came from the Russian alphabet that borrowed it from French in the 19th century.
 The  ((CYRILLIC) SHORT U) was proposed by Russian linguist Pyotr Bezsonov in 1870.

The Belarusian alphabet, in its modern form, has formally existed since the adoption of Branislaw Tarashkyevich's Belarusian grammar, for use in Soviet schools, in 1918  Several slightly different versions had been used informally. 

In the 1920s and notably at the Belarusian Academical Conference (1926), miscellaneous changes of the Belarusian alphabet were proposed. Even the introduction of the Latin script was contemplated at one moment (as proposed by Zhylunovich at the Belarusian Academical Conference (1926)). Nothing came of it.

Noted Belarusian linguist Yan Stankyevich in his later works suggested a completely different form of the alphabet:

Note that proper names and place names are rendered in BGN/PCGN romanization of Belarusian.

Keyboard layout

The standard Belarusian keyboard layout for personal computers is as follows:

See also
Belarusian orthography reform of 1933
Cyrillic script
Cyrillic alphabets
Romanization of Belarusian

References 

 Да рэформы беларускай азбукі. // Працы акадэмічнае канферэнцыі па рэформе беларускага правапісу і азбукі. – Мн. : [б. м.], 1927.
 Ян Станкевіч. Які мае быць парадак літараў беларускае абэцады [1962] // Ян Станкевіч. Збор твораў у двух тамах. Т. 2. – Мн.: Энцыклапедыкс, 2002. 
 Б. Тарашкевіч. Беларуская граматыка для школ. – Вільня : Беларуская друкарня ім. Фр. Скарыны, 1929 ; Мн. : <Народная асвета>, 1991 [факсімільн.]. – Выданьне пятае пераробленае і пашыранае.
 Што трэба ведаць кожнаму беларусу. Выданне „Вольнае Беларусі“. – Менск : друк-ня А. Я. Грынблята, 1918 ; Менск : Беларускае коопэрацыйна-выдавецкае таварыства ″Адраджэньне″, 1991 [факсімільн.]. – Зборнік артыкулау розных аутарау: М. Міцкевіча, Я. Лёсіка, В. Ластоўскаго, М. Багдановіча, Пётр[?] з Арленят і інш.

External links 
 Taraškievizer: Converts Belarusian text from official spelling (Narkamaŭka) to classical spelling (Taraškievica)
 Romanizer: Cyrillic to Latin script converter: Belarusian
 Introduction to Belarusian Alphabet
 Introduction to Belarusian Latin Script
 Belarusian language using Arabic script
 Letter Frequency in Belarusian and Russian
 Беларускі альфабэт

Alphabet
Cyrillic alphabets